Derrick Dewayne Allen (born July 17, 1980) is an American professional basketball coach and former player. He was most recently the head coach for Rasta Vechta of the ProA.

Playing career

College basketball 
Growing up in Gadsden, Alabama, Allen attended Gadsden High School before his time at Southern Union State Community College in Wadley, Alabama. In 2000, he was named Alabama Junior Community College Conference (AJCCC) Player of the Year and transferred to Ole Miss following his sophomore year.

He had to redshirt the 2000–01 season due to tendonitis in his left knee. Allen saw action in 60 games with the Ole Miss Rebels between 2001 and 2003, averaging 8.6 points and 5.4 rebounds per contest.

Professional basketball 
Allen launched his professional basketball career in Iceland, playing for Keflavík in the 2003–04 campaign. He was a key player in Keflavík's double-winning campaign (national championship and cup competition), turning in averages of 23.4 points and 10.5 rebounds in league play. In eight games of the FIBA Europe Cup (FIBA EuroCup Challenge), he averaged 26.6 points and 9.4 boards a contest.

In the following years, Allen made his mark in the German Basketball Bundesliga, playing for BG Karlsruhe, Bayer Giants Leverkusen, the Skyliners Frankfurt and Alba Berlin. He garnered Eurobasket.com All-German Bundesliga Forward of the Year honors in 2008 and was a Eurobasket.com All-German Bundesliga First Team selection in 2008, 2010 and 2011. He reached the Bundesliga finals with Frankfurt in 2010 and with Berlin in 2011. Over the years, Allen made multiple appearances in international competitions such as the EuroCup, the FIBA EuroChallenge and the FIBA Europe Cup (FIBA EuroCup Challenge).

After spending the 2012–13 season with Belgian powerhouse Spirou BC Charleroi, Allen returned to Germany, enjoying stints with Eisbären Bremerhaven, Basketball Löwen Braunschweig and SC Rasta Vechta. He was part of Vechta's Bundesliga promotion-winning side in 2016. At the end of the 2016–17 Bundesliga season, his Vechta team had to accept relegation from the German top-tier. Allen signed with another BBL team, Science City Jena on May 23, 2017.

Allen announced his retirement from professional basketball in August 2019.

Coaching 
In September 2019, he was named assistant coach at German Bundesliga side SC Rasta Vechta. He stayed on that job until the end of the 2019–20 season. On August 11, 2020, he has re-signed with Rasta Vechta. Allen was promoted to the head coaching role on March 29, 2021 following the firing of Thomas Päch. Allen's Vechta team was relegated to the German second-tier ProA at the conclusion of the 2020–21 season. He was released in October 2021 after five straight losses.

References

External links 
 profile at eurocupbasketball.com
 profile at eurobasket.com Profile
 profile at fibaeurope.com
Profile at realgm.com

1980 births
Living people
Alba Berlin players
American expatriate basketball people in Belgium
American expatriate basketball people in Germany
American expatriate basketball people in Iceland
American men's basketball players
Basketball Löwen Braunschweig players
Basketball players from Alabama
Bayer Giants Leverkusen players
BG Karlsruhe players
Eisbären Bremerhaven players
Junior college men's basketball players in the United States
Keflavík men's basketball players
Ole Miss Rebels men's basketball players
Power forwards (basketball)
Science City Jena players
SC Rasta Vechta players
Skyliners Frankfurt players
Spirou Charleroi players
Sportspeople from Gadsden, Alabama
Úrvalsdeild karla (basketball) players